Sør-Rana is a former municipality in Nordland county, Norway.  The  municipality existed from 1929 until 1964 (Hemnes Municipality was also named Sør-Rana from 1838 until 1844).  Sør-Rana encompassed an area on both sides of the middle section of the Ranfjorden around where the Sørfjorden and Elsfjorden branch off the main fjord.

History

Rana Municipality was established on 1 January 1838 under the old formannskapsdistrikt law.  Shortly afterwards, in 1839, the municipality was divided into Nord-Ranen and Sør-Ranen.  In 1844, Sør-Ranen was renamed Hemnes.  On 1 July 1918, the southern part of Hemnes (population: 1,369) was separated to become the municipality of Korgen.  On 1 July 1929 the large municipality of Hemnes was divided into three separate municipalities:  Elsfjord (population: 765) in the southwest, Hemnes (population: 1,077) which included the small area around the village of Hemnesberget, and Sør-Rana (population: 1,708) in the north and east.

During the 1960s, there were many municipal mergers across Norway due to the work of the Schei Committee. On 1 January 1964, Sør-Rana municipality was dissolved and its lands were divided up.  The district of Sør-Rana that was north of the Ranfjorden, with 697 inhabitants, was merged with the town of Mo i Rana (population: 9,6168), the municipality of Nord-Rana (population: 11,636), and the eastern part of Nesna Municipality (population: 543) to create the new Rana Municipality. The rest of Sør-Rana (south of the Ranfjorden), with 934 inhabitants, was merged with Hemnes Municipality (population: 1,352), the municipality of Korgen (population: 3,033), and the northern part of Hattfjelldal Municipality (population: 168) to form a new, larger Hemnes Municipality.

Name
The municipality was named Sør-Rana. The first element is sør which directly translates to "southern". The second element is Rana which comes from the local river Ranelva. The name of the river is probably derived from the word  which means "quick", "fast", or "rapid". Another possibility is that the name comes from the old Sami god Rana Niejta.

Government
While it existed, this municipality was responsible for primary education (through 10th grade), outpatient health services, senior citizen services, unemployment, social services, zoning, economic development, and municipal roads. During its existence, this municipality was governed by a municipal council of elected representatives, which in turn elected a mayor.

Municipal council
The municipal council  of Sør-Rana was made up of 15 representatives that were elected to four year terms.  The party breakdown of the final municipal council was as follows:

Mayors
The mayors of Sør-Rana:

 1929-1934: Johan L. Fineide
 1935-1937: O. Bjørnåli
 1937-1938: Ole Evensen
 1938-1940: Hans J. Utskarpen
 1945-1945: O. Bjørnåli
 1945-1945: Hans J. Utskarpen
 1946-1955: Ole Evensen 
 1956-1961: Kristoffer Almli
 1962-1964: Kåre Rønning (Sp)

See also
List of former municipalities of Norway

References

Rana, Norway
Hemnes
Former municipalities of Norway
1929 establishments in Norway
1964 disestablishments in Norway